Regina Lúcia Palhano Braga Varella (born September 28, 1945) is a Brazilian actress.

References

1946 births
Living people
Brazilian film actresses
Brazilian telenovela actresses